Peter Oboh (born 6 September 1968 in Lagos) is a Nigerian born British former professional boxer who competed from 1993 to 2004. He held the British, Commonwealth and WBA Inter-Continental light heavyweight titles between 2002 and 2004.

Professional boxing record

References

External links

Image - Peter Oboh

1968 births
Cruiserweight boxers
Heavyweight boxers
Light-heavyweight boxers
Nigerian male boxers
Sportspeople from Lagos
Boxers from Greater London
Living people
British male boxers